Kayseri Spor Kulübü, commonly known as Kayserispor, is a Turkish professional football club based in Kayseri. They play their home matches at the Kadir Has Stadium in red and yellow kits.

The team has won one Turkish Cup in 2008 and also finished as Turkish Super Cup runners-up in the same year. They finished fifth in the Turkish Super League four times, in 2005–06, 2006–07, 2007–08, and 2012–13. Internationally, Kayserispor was one of the co-winners of the 2006 Intertoto Cup.

History 

Erciyesspor, which was Kayserispor's predecessor, was founded as Erciyesspor with red-white colours. In 1937, Erciyesspor merged with Yılmazspor and changed their colours to yellow-red. It was merged into Kayseri Gençlik in 1940. They were refounded in 1948 with yellow-navy colours. They merged with Kayseri Gençlik in 1949 and changed their colours to yellow-red. They were dissolved in 1951. But they were refounded by Naci Ulucan in 1952. They played in a regional league until 1966.

In 1965, Orhan Şefik Apak, then president of the Turkish Football Federation, asked cities in Turkey to combine their amateur football clubs into one singular club that would represent their communities. These new clubs would compete in the newly created 2.Lig (Second Division). After several meetings, representatives of the city merged Erciyesspor, Sanayispor, and Ortaanadoluspor to form Kayserispor. The club submitted the required paperwork and were officially founded as Kayserispor on 1 July 1966. They began competing in the 1966–67 2.Lig. Erdoğan Gürhan was the first manager, signing a contract worth 1,500 TL. In their first season, the club competed in the Beyaz Grup (White Group). Yener scored the first goal in club history when he netted a shot in the 17th minute against Ankara Toprakspor. The club finished with a nine win, nine draw, and twelve loss record in 30 matches while scoring 21 goals and conceding 33. They finished in ninth place.

It was refounded as Kayseri Emniyetspor with red-navy colours. They merged with Kayserigücü, whose former name was Mahrumlarspor in 1985. They were promoted to 3rd level in 1988. However changed their name to Kayseri Erciyesspor due to the Security General Directorate's decision to withdraw Security teams from leagues. They changed their colours to black-white. They became Büyükşehir Belediye Erciyesspor with blue-white colours in 1992, Melikgazi Belediyesi Erciyesspor with yellow-red in 1997, and Hacılar Erciyesspor with yellow-navy colours in 1999. They were promoted to second level in the 1999–2000 season. They changed their name to Erciyesspor and colours to yellow-red in 2001. They were relegated to third level in the 2001–2002 season. But after successive two promotions, Erciyesspor reached the top level in 2004. It was at this time that Kayserspor switched names with Kayseri Erciyesspor. Manager Hüsnü Özkara was fired seven matches into the season after accumulating two points out of a possible twenty-one. Hikmet Karaman took over as manager and guided the club to a 14th-place finish, two places above the relegation zone.

Ertuğrul Sağlam, former Samsunspor and Beşiktaş player, took over for Karaman at the end of the season. Sağlam led the club to fifth place in the league, and Gökhan Ünal won the "Gol Kralı" (top goal scorer) award after netting 25 goals in 32 matches. The club qualified for European competition for the first time. The club would go on to win the 2006 UEFA Intertoto Cup and qualified for the 2006–07 UEFA Cup, where they lost to AZ in the second round. Kayserispor finished fifth for the second time in a row at the end of the 2006–07 season. Sağlam moved to Beşiktaş over the summer, with Tolunay Kafkas being his replacement. Kafkas led the club to a third straight fifth-place finish, as well as the club's first Turkish Cup title in 2008. On 15 October 2012 Robert Prosinečki was assigned as manager of Kayserispor, Gordan Ciprić and Dragan Spasić assisted him. They finished 5th in the 2012–13 season. But, the next season Kayserispor relegated from the Süper Lig, finishing as last, despite assigning three managers during the season to change its faith. Fortune changed in the 2014–15 season; manager Cüneyt Dumlupınar led the club to the championship, earning the club ones again a spot in the Süper Lig.

Due to sponsordeals the club name changed over the years. As of January 2019 the club's name altered into İstikbal Mobilya Kayserispor . In January 2020 the club's name revised into HES Kablo Kayserispor. As of August 2021 the name was changed into Yukatel Kayserispor.

End 2019, Berna Gözbaşı, a member of the club board, was elected president of the football club, becoming the first woman president of a football club playing in the Turkish top-level men's league.

In the 2021-22 season Kayserispor introduced its third kit (light blue) in accordance with corporate social responsibility (CSR). These jerseys, inspired by Seljuk motifs, with an "Autism Awareness" logo are intended to draw attention for people with autism.

Manager Hikmet Karaman led the team to the final of the 2021–22 Turkish Cup, however it was archrival Sivasspor who grabbed the title with a 3-2 win after extra time.

Stadium 
Kadir Has Stadium is a multi-use stadium in Kayseri, Turkey. It is part of a complex of sports venues that are planned on the outskirts of the city, as part of the Atatürk Sport Complex. It replaced Kayseri Atatürk Stadium, which had been in use since 1964. It was completed in early 2008, and has primarily been used to host the home matches of Kayserispor and Kayseri Erciyesspor. The stadium has a capacity of 32,864 (all-seated) and is covered. The stadium contains several restaurants, cafes, and VIP areas for fans. Two shopping centres are also located nearby, and the parking lot holds 1,785 cars. The light-rail system of Kayseri, Kayseray, passes near the stadium complex, allowing the fans an alternative to traveling by car or bus.

Crest and colours

Emblem
The mountains in the emblem represent Kayseri's landmark Mount Erciyes, the K represents Kayseri, the S represents Spor and 1966 signifies the year the club (now Kayseri Erciyesspor) was founded.

Records and statistics

European Cups history

Notes
 1R: First round
 2R: Second round
 3R: Third round
 2Q: Second qualifying round

Players

Current squad

Out on loan

Kayserispor Youth Academy

Staff

Technical staff

Supporting staff

Foreign (ex-)managers

Honours

Domestic competitions

Leagues
TFF First League
Winners (1): 2014–15
1. Lig
Winners (1): 1973

Cups
Turkish Cup
Winners (1): 2007–08
Runners-up (1): 2021–22
Turkish Super Cup
Runners-up (1): 2008

European competitions
UEFA Intertoto Cup
Winners (1): 2006 (joint winners)

Further reading
Başaran, Kenan (2017). Sivas-Kayseri; Türkiye'nin büyük futbol faciası. İletişim Yayınları. ISBN-13: 978-975-05-2270-3

Cengiz, Mustafa (1998). Kayserispor Tarihi. Kayseri Büyükşehir Belediyesi Kültür Müdürlüğü.

References

External links

Kayserispor on TFF.org

 
Association football clubs established in 1966
Sport in Kayseri
Football clubs in Turkey
Süper Lig clubs